Pulham Market is a village and civil parish in Norfolk, situated approximately  northeast of Diss and  south of Norwich.

The name 'Pulham' means 'pool homestead/village' or 'pool hemmed-in land'.

The nearest railway station is Diss. It once had its own station on the Waveney Valley Line which is now closed. The long-distance footpath Boudica's Way runs through the village.

Older maps and documents name the parish or village "Pulham Saint Mary Magdalene" after the dedication of its parish church. The neighbouring parish and village was historically known as "Pulham Saint Mary the Virgin" after the dedication of its own parish church, though is these days typically abbreviated to Pulham St Mary.

The earliest recorded spelling is Polleham. Pulham is referenced in the Domesday Book of 1086 as a single manor (including both Pulham Market and Pulham St Mary as we know them today) and being part of the Earsham hundred. The name Pulham is thought to mean the farmhouse, homestead or enclosure by the pool, water meadow or stream. There is a 'beck' (Norfolk dialect for a small watercourse) that flows by both villages.

In modern times the two villages of Pulham St Mary and Pulham Market are often together described as The Pulhams including on road signs in the surrounding areas.

The village was struck by an F0/T1 tornado on 23 November 1981, as part of the record-breaking nationwide tornado outbreak on that day. Another tornado later struck nearby Pulham St Mary.

As of 2019, the village has a primary school, a doctors' surgery, two pubs (The Crown and The Falcon), a shop/post office, and several other community facilities.

See also
RNAS Pulham

Notes

 http://kepn.nottingham.ac.uk/map/place/Norfolk/Pulham%20St.%20Mary%20the%20Virgin

External links

Pulham Market Parish Council

Villages in Norfolk
Civil parishes in Norfolk
South Norfolk